"Water Me" is Bonnie Pink's twenty-eighth single and is taken from the album Thinking Out Loud. The single was released under the Warner Music Japan label on June 6, 2007. It was used as the ending theme for the 2007 Japanese television drama Watashitachi no Kyōkasho.

Track listing
Water Me
Gimme a Beat
Magical Mystery Tour
Water Me (Instrumental)
Gimme a Beat (Instrumental)

Oricon Sales Chart

2007 singles
2007 songs
Bonnie Pink songs
Japanese television drama theme songs
Warner Music Japan singles
Songs written by Bonnie Pink